Conservative management is a type of medical treatment defined by the avoidance of invasive measures such as surgery or other invasive procedures,  usually with the intent to preserve function or body parts. For example, in appendicitis, conservative management may include watchful waiting and treatment with antibiotics, as opposed to surgical removal of the appendix.

References

Medical terminology